John Hore may refer to:

John Hore (1680–1763), an English engineer
John Hore (footballer, born 1947), English footballer who played for and managed Plymouth Argyle
John Hore (footballer, born 1982), English footballer who played for Carlisle United
John Hore (MP for Bridport) (died c. 1452), English MP for Bridport (UK Parliament constituency)
John Hore (MP for Huntingdonshire and Cambridgeshire) (died c. 1434), English MP for Huntingdonshire and Cambridgeshire
John Hore (songwriter) (born 1944), later called John Hore Grenell or John Grenell, New Zealand country singer and songwriter
John Hore (rugby union) (1907–1970), New Zealand rugby union player, All Black.

See also
 John Hoar (pirate) (died 1697), American/Irish pirate active in the Red Sea
 John Hoar (died 1704), American militia leader during King Philip's War